East Timor participated at the 2011 Southeast Asian Games which were held in the cities of Palembang and Jakarta, Indonesia from 11 November 2011 to 22 November 2011. East Timor got its first ever gold medal since it joined the SEA Games.

Competitors

Medals

Medal table

Medals by date

Medalists

2011
Southeast Asian Games
Nations at the 2011 Southeast Asian Games